William Lathbury (29 September 1843 – 7 March 1884) was a New Zealand cricketer. He played one first-class match for Otago in 1875/76.

See also
 List of Otago representative cricketers

References

1843 births
1884 deaths
New Zealand cricketers
Otago cricketers
Sportspeople from Staffordshire
British emigrants to New Zealand